Pertti Olavi "Veltto" Virtanen (born 18 May 1951 in Hämeenlinna) is a rock personality, former presidential candidate, and former member of the Finnish Parliament from Tampere, Finland.

In music he performed both as a solo artist and in the bands Virtanen (with Moog Konttinen), Välikausitakki and Sammas. Elektroninen xstaasi is considered the most famous of Veltto Virtanen's songs. Välikausitakki was notable for including also Mikko Alatalo, Harri Rinne and later also Juice Leskinen.

After running as a protest candidate in the 1994 presidential election, his surprisingly high popular vote spurred him to run in the 1995 election for the house of representatives as an essentially independent candidate, and succeeded in winning a seat. His terms in the Parliament were characteristically quixotic; the speeches he made being exercises in near-shamanistic elocution, and counter to parliamentary protocol refusing to bare his head, sporting various headgear, but being most famous for his "artistic" beret.

The minor party KiPu, which tactically allied with Virtanen, never won a seat of its own; thus he formed a one-man party-group in the parliament. Outside critics of the phenomenon of his political success wrote a critical book about it titled Huijari - Veltto Virtanen & Kirjava Puolue (publisher: Veitikka Kustannus 1999).

He continued in elective politics by running in the 1999 and 2003 parliamentary elections, but failed to win a seat due to the Finnish D'Hondt method of voting which favours large parties over minor ones.

Virtanen became again a member of Parliament in parliamentary elections of 2007, this time representing the True Finns party. He served two terms but did not run for re-election anymore in the parliamentary elections of 2015

Virtanen was elected to the Tampere city council in 2000 with 2038 votes.

Besides his musical and political career, he has also worked as a motivational speaker, most notably for some winter sports teams. On May Day 2011 the newly elected member of the parliament delivered a somewhat controversial political Mayday speech, where he stated that if the Swedish People's Party were to become part of the next cabinet with the True Finns, he would resign from the party and vomit for five days.

List of albums
 Virtanen: Hal-00 (1974)
 Virtanen: Uusi jääkausi uhkaa (1975)
 Kusessa (1976)
 Ronkpukki (1978)
 Välikausitakki: Välikausitakki (1978)
 Tässä seison (1978)
 Beibi (1982)
 Virtanen: Klassikot - Ne Surkeimmat (1990)
 Sammas: Sampo-Passio (1990)

References

External links

The official Veltto Virtanen homepage

1951 births
Living people
People from Hämeenlinna
Finns Party politicians
Members of the Parliament of Finland (1995–99)
Members of the Parliament of Finland (2007–11)
Members of the Parliament of Finland (2011–15)
Finnish male musicians
Finnish psychologists